Björn Arens (born 29 September 1972) is a retired German football defender.

References

1972 births
Living people
German footballers
Wuppertaler SV players
1. FC Köln II players
Rot-Weiß Oberhausen players
VfB Lübeck players
2. Bundesliga players
Association football defenders